Carl Holmes (October 19, 1940) is an American politician, and a Republican former member of the Kansas House of Representatives, who represented the 125th district from 1985 to 2013.

Prior to his election to the House, Holmes served as mayor of the city of Plains from 1982 to 1989.  Since 1962 he has worked as a land manager of Holmes Farms.

Holmes received his BBA from Colorado State University.

Holmes was defeated in the August 7, 2012, Republican Primary by Reid Petty, losing by only 9 votes, 904–895. Petty is a member of the school board in Liberal and is the Seward County Republican Chairman.

Committee membership
Energy and Utilities (Chair)
Agriculture and Natural Resources Budget
Joint Committee on Administrative Rules and Regulations (Chair)
Joint Committee on Energy and Environmental Policy (Vice-Chair)

Major donors
The top 5 donors to Holmes's 2008 campaign:
1. Pioneer Communications - $1,000 	
2. Westar Energy - $1,000 	
3. Kansas Contractors Assoc - $1,000 	
4. AT&T - $1,000 	
5. Prairie Band Potawatomi Nation - $750

References

External links
Kansas Legislature - Carl Holmes
Project Vote Smart profile
Kansas Votes profile
State Surge - Legislative and voting track record
Campaign contributions: 1996,1998,2000, 2002, 2004, 2006, 2008

Republican Party members of the Kansas House of Representatives
Living people
1940 births
Colorado State University alumni
20th-century American politicians
21st-century American politicians
People from Liberal, Kansas